On December 3, 1971, Jean Eugene Paul Kay, a French humanitarian activist, hijacked Pakistan International Airlines flight PK712 (a Boeing 720), at Orly Airport outside Paris, France. The flight was bound from London to Karachi via Paris, Rome and Cairo. Kay boarded the flight in Paris with five other passengers and took control of the aircraft on gunpoint. He demanded for 20 tons of medical supplies to be loaded onto the plane and sent to the refugees of Bangladesh Liberation War sheltered in India, and threatened to blow up the aircraft if the demands were not met. After a standoff of seven hours, Kay was apprehended by two police personnel who boarded the aircraft in the guise of volunteers delivering the supplies he demanded.

See also 

 Bangladesh Liberation War
 1971 Bangladesh genocide

References 

Aircraft hijackings
Pakistan International Airlines accidents and incidents